Nasir Ahmed, or variant spellings, may refer to:

 Nasir Ahmed (Bangladeshi cricketer) (born 1964), Bangladeshi cricketer
 Nasir Ahmed (cricketer, born 1989), Pakistani cricketer
 Nasir Ahmed (field hockey) (born 1984), Pakistani field hockey player
 Nasir Ahmed (engineer) (born 1940), Indian-American electrical engineer and computer scientist
 Naseer Ahmed (born 1972), Pakistani wrestler
 Naseer Ahmad (born 1995), Afghan cricketer

See also
 Mirza Nasir Ahmad (1909–1982)